Rubene is a Latvian Floorball League team based in Rubene, Kocēni Parish, Latvia.

Goaltenders
  1  Roberts Trepšs
44  Āris Ulmanis
39  Āris Aldiņš

Defencemen
  4  Oskars Keišs
14  Jānis Bagāts(C)
17  Ivars Jēkabsons
18  Einārs Ločmelis
23  Kaspars Grundšteins
29  Juris Zilberts
88  Kaspars Antons
99  Matīss Mālnieks

Forwards
  5  Ringolds Kalniņš
  8  Andris Jēkabsons
12  Leo Lapiņš
13  Ingars Matisons
19  Uģis Karasevs
21  Mārtiņš Zelčs
24  Jānis Grundšteins
31  Atis Stepāns

References
Rubene official web site

Floorball in Latvia
Latvian floorball teams